Sir Joseph Wesley Flavelle, 1st Baronet (February 15, 1858 – March 7, 1939) was a Canadian businessman.

Life and career
Joseph Wesley Flavelle was born on February 15, 1858, in Peterbough, Canada West, to John and Dorothea (Dundas) Flavelle. He married Clara Ellsworth in 1882. By the 1890s, Flavelle had made his fortune in the meatpacking business as president of William Davies Company, which was the British Empire's largest pork packing firm. He subsequently became prominent in finance and commerce as chairman of the Bank of Commerce, National Trust and Simpson's department stores.

Flavelle was chairman of the Imperial Munitions Board during World War I, and it was for reorganizing the industry that he was awarded a baronetcy in 1917. His was the last British hereditary title to be granted in the normal course to a Canadian citizen, due to the passage of the Nickle Resolution in 1919.

Flavelle died on March 7, 1939, in Palm Beach, Florida. He left his Queen's Park mansion (Holwood House at 78 Queen's Park Crescent) to the University of Toronto. It is now called Flavelle House and forms part of the university's Faculty of Law. He was succeeded in the Flavelle baronetcy by his son, Ellsworth.

References

Bibliography
 
 
 Sir Joseph Wesley Flavelle at The Canadian Encyclopedia

External links
 
 Sir Joseph Flavelle fonds at Queen's University Archives
 

1858 births
1939 deaths
19th-century Canadian businesspeople
Baronets in the Baronetage of the United Kingdom
Canadian baronets
20th-century Canadian businesspeople
Canadian food industry businesspeople